Big Apple Worldwide Holdings Sdn Bhd (doing business as Big Apple Donuts & Coffee) is a café retailer in Malaysia specializing in donuts and coffee. The company is a subsidiary of Duskin Co. Ltd. The company is owned and managed by Big Apple Inter-Asia. Big Apple Donuts & Coffee opened its first outlet and began trading in 2007. The first outlet located at The Curve in Damansara, Selangor, Malaysia.

Locations
Big Apple has locations in Malaysia and Cambodia.

See also
 List of doughnut shops
 List of coffeehouse chains

References

External links
 

2007 establishments in Malaysia
Restaurants established in 2007
Doughnut shops
Coffeehouses and cafés
Bakeries of Malaysia
Restaurants in Malaysia
Privately held companies of Malaysia